Ski Park Manager is a video game released in 2002, developed by Lankhor and published by Microïds.

The game has 42 challenges and three levels of difficulty. The game has a career mode, where you buy and sell your ski resorts, to acquire the most popular ones. There is a training module, to learn the techniques of the game. This is a large variety of scenarios, including bankruptcy, school holidays, snowstorms, accidents, avalanches and low snowfall.

To entertain your holiday makers, the game has a large number of possible activities. Some of these are downhill and cross-country skiing, sledding, walking and shopping. You must construct your own infrastructure including chalets, hotels, apartments, facilities, shops, restaurants and bars. The landscape can be modified, for example by deforesting. And also allows players to develop and research new buildings in the Ski Lab plus building.

External links 
 Ski Park Manager at Microïds

2002 video games
Business simulation games
Skiing video games
Video games developed in France
Windows games
Windows-only games
Microïds games
Lankhor games